When I Was a Work of Art (Lorsque j'étais une oeuvre d'art) is a novel by Éric-Emmanuel Schmitt, a Belgian dramatist and writer. The novel tells the story of a young man who gives up his humanity to an artist, who transforms the young man into a work of art. The novel was published in 2002 (originally in French) and was Schmitt's fourth novel. The novel is based on Faust by Goethe.

Plot
Tazio Firelli, a young man, is about to commit suicide when Zeus-Peter Lama, an eccentric well-known artist, offers to make Tazio want to live. Lama then convinces Tazio to give up his humanity to become a living sculpture named Adam Bis, the first of its kind according to Lama. While being a work of art, Tazio becomes depressed, feeling that he has lost his humanity and his freedom. Tazio then meets a blind painter named Carlos Hannibal and his daughter Fiona. The relationship between the three gives Tazio the will to live again. Fiona then organises a lawsuit, for the purpose of getting back Tazio's liberty. The lawsuit culminates when Lama announces that Tazio is a fake of the original Adam Bis and is hence worthless. Once free, Tazio marries Fiona.

Characters 
 The narrator: Tazio Adam Firelli, 20 years old, suicidal and non-existent, who will become the living sculpture "Adam bis"
 Zeus-Peter Lama: a famous contemporary artist
 Dr. Fichet : forensic doctor forced to work for Lama because of his gambling debts
 Carlos Hannibal: great painter of the invisible, lives near Lama's residence
 Fiona Hannibal: daughter of the painter Carlos Hannibal, future wife of Adam
 Enzo and Rienzi Firelli: brothers of Tazio, considered the most beautiful men in the world
 Zoltan: driver of Zeus-Peter Lama
 Titus : servant of Zeus-Peter Lama

Reception
The novel was generally well-received, with a review in the Figaro calling it an "original love story" with "excellent social commentary."

References

External links
http://www.frenchpubagency.com/Title-199175-Fiction-Literature/Lorsque-j%E2%80%99etais-une-oeuvre-d%E2%80%99art.html

2002 Belgian novels